Monanus is a genus of beetles in the family Silvanidae, containing the following species:

 Monanus albertisi Grouvelle
 Monanus antennatus Grouvelle
 Monanus bisinuatus Grouvelle
 Monanus bouchardi Grouvelle
 Monanus cairnensis Blackburn
 Monanus concinnulus Walker
 Monanus denticulatus Grouvelle
 Monanus discoidalis Grouvelle
 Monanus insolitus Grouvelle
 Monanus longicornis Grouvelle
 Monanus longipennis Grouvelle
 Monanus malaicus Grouvelle
 Monanus monticola Blackburn
 Monanus ornatus Grouvelle
 Monanus punctatus Grouvelle
 Monanus raffrayi Grouvelle
 Monanus rambicus Pal
 Monanus rugosus Grouvelle
 Monanus telephanoides Grouvelle
 Monanus temporalis Grouvelle
 Monanus villosus Grouvelle

References

Silvanidae genera